José Luis Munuera Montero (born 19 May 1983) is a Spanish football referee who officiates in La Liga. He has been a FIFA referee since 2019, and is ranked as a UEFA second category referee.

Refereeing career
Munuera Montero began officiating in the Segunda División B in 2010, the Segunda División in 2013 and La Liga in 2016. He officiated his first match in La Liga on 22 August 2016 between Celta Vigo and Leganés. In 2019, he was put on the FIFA referees list. He officiated his first UEFA club competition match on 1 August 2019, a meeting between Romanian club Viitorul Constanța and Belgian club Gent in the 2019–20 UEFA Europa League second qualifying round. His first senior international match as referee was on 7 October 2020 between Andorra and Cape Verde.

As part of a referee exchange programme between UEFA and CONMEBOL, Munuera Montero was selected on 21 April 2021 as a video assistant referee for the 2021 Copa América in Argentina and Colombia. He will be joined by four of his compatriots at the tournament, marking the first time a team of European referees were selected to officiate at the Copa América.

Personal life
Munuera Montero was born in Jaén, and owns several restaurants in Córdoba.

References

External links
 
 
 José Luis Munuera Montero at EU-Football.info

1983 births
Living people
Sportspeople from Jaén, Spain
Spanish football referees